The Brantley County School District is a public school district in Brantley County, Georgia, United States, based in Nahunta. It serves the communities of Hoboken, Hortense, Nahunta, and Waynesville.

Schools
The Brantley County School District has five elementary schools, one middle school, and one high school.

Elementary schools
Atkinson Elementary School
Hoboken Elementary School
Nahunta Elementary School
Nahunta Primary School
Waynesville Primary School

Middle school
Brantley County Middle School

High school
Brantley County High School

References

External links

School districts in Georgia (U.S. state)
Education in Brantley County, Georgia